The Hong Kong ePrix was an annual race of the single-seater, electrically powered Formula E championship, held at the Hong Kong Central Harbourfront Circuit in Hong Kong. The track was touted as a potential venue for the all-electric series’ inaugural race. It was first raced in the 2016–17 season as the first major international motorsport event in Hong Kong.

In 2018–19 season, the 2019 Hong Kong ePrix  was the 50th race of Formula E since its inception in 2014. It was widely expected to be the first wet race in Formula E racing history. Drivers tested the grip levels in both shakedown and practice sessions on a fully wet track, but it did not eventuate. The ePrix was scheduled to be on the 2019–20 calendar, but it was replaced due to pro-democracy protests and the COVID-19 pandemic in Hong Kong.

Circuit
The ten turn  circuit, located in the Central Harbourfront area is a firm favourite on the Formula E calendar. Making use of existing roads, all racing cars and drivers drive past landmarks including the International Finance Centre, Hong Kong Observation Wheel, and Hong Kong City Hall.

Significant portions of the track were covered with painted road signs, which could turn the race to extremely unexpected under serious rainy conditions according to some drivers. There were different tarmac and painted road markings around the circuit, which made some parts of the track slippery and treacherous on an adverse camber section. Still, the drainage is facilitated by the presence of concrete blocks with holes.

The circuit failed to meet regulations set forth by the Fédération Internationale de l'Automobile (FIA). Lawrence Yu, governor of the Hong Kong Automobile Association, cited difficulties in extending the track to the west as the Hong Kong Station on the western side of the circuit links up the city with the airport. An extension to the east of the circuit through a tunnel considered too dangerous for the cars to be running at high speeds along a straight road before they enter the tunnel.

The Hong Kong ePrix was eventually dropped from the 2019–20 season on the ground of continued protests in the city.

Results

Controversy
With over 350 skyscrapers sitting on Hong Kong's shoreline, it was claimed several drivers encountered radio communication problems due to the buildings blocking the signal, which forced them to recalculate their energy management unassisted.

References

 
Hong Kong
International sports competitions hosted by Hong Kong
Motorsport in Hong Kong
Recurring sporting events established in 2016